National public health institutes (NPHIs) are science-based governmental organizations that serve as a focal point for a country's public health efforts, as well as a critical component of global disease prevention and response systems. Among the better known NPHIs are the United States Centers for Disease Control and Prevention, and the Chinese Center for Disease Control and Prevention.

Typical core functions of NPHIs include surveillance for diseases and injuries, as well as risk factors; epidemiologic investigations of health problems; public health research; and response to public health emergencies. Recent public health challenges, such as the COVID-19 pandemic, may have significant impacts on the missions and structures of NPHIs. Although these functions are in many countries dispersed among several agencies, in recent years some countries have reorganized their public health systems to consolidate functions. For example, following the outbreak of severe acute respiratory syndrome (SARS) in 2003, the Canadian government created the Public Health Agency of Canada in order to ensure a more efficient and effective response in future outbreaks.

International Association

The International Association of National Public Health Institutes (IANPHI) is a member organization of NPHIs that in the end of 2019 had  members from 99 countries, benefitting more than 5 billion people. IANPHI helps link the NPHIs of the world, so that they can share knowledge and experiences, in addition to providing support for NPHI development in low-resources countries. The majority of funding for IANPHI comes from the Bill and Melinda Gates Foundation.

See also
List of national public health agencies
Burnet Institute (Australia)
Canadian Institute of Public Health Inspectors
Instituto Oswaldo Cruz (Brazil)
Institute of Public Health (Bangladesh)
Peruvian National Institute of Health
National Institute of Public Health of Japan
National Institutes of Health (United States)
National Public Health Institute of Finland 
National Public Health Organization of Greece
Netherlands National Institute for Public Health and the Environment
Norwegian Institute of Public Health
Palestinian National Institute of Public Health
People's Republic of China#Public health and environment
Indian Institutes of Public Health
Public Health Agency of Sweden
Robert Koch Institute (Germany)
UK Health Security Agency
Sciensano (Belgium)

Notes

References

 Koplan, J.P., Bond, T.C., Merson, M.H., Reddy, K.S., Rodriguez, M.H., Sewankambo, N.K, & Wasserheit, J.N., for the Consortium of Universities for Global Health Executive Board. (2009). Towards a common definition of global health. Lancet, 373, 1993–1995.
 Frenk, J., & González-Block, M.Á. (2008). Institutional development for public health: learning the lessons, renewing the commitment, Journal of Public Health Policy, 29, 449–458.
 Adigun, L., Dusenbury, C., & Schoub, B.D. (2007, November). Public health in Africa – the role of national public health institutes. South African Medical Journal, 97, 1036–1039.
 Koplan, J.P., Dusenbury, C., Jousilahti, P., & Puska, P. (2007). The role of national public health institutes in health infrastructure development. British Medical Journal, 335, 834–835.
 Koplan, J.P., Puska, P., Jousilahti, P., Cahill, K., & Huttunen, J. (2005). National Public Health Institute partners. Improving the world's health through national public health institutes. Bulletin of the World Health Organization, 83, 154–157.

External links

 IANPHI's website
 South Africa National Institute for Communicable Diseases

Government health agencies